Periyanaickenpalayam is a suburb of Coimbatore in the Indian state of Tamil Nadu. It is upcoming developing region . It is covered with many industries around it . It is well connected by road and rail transport. It is located along National Highway NH 67, Mettupalayam road, an arterial road in Coimbatore. The road used to be lined with tamarind trees along both sides planted by philanthropist K.Rangaswamy Naidu. He was instrumental in the development of Periyanaickenpalayam and was popularly known as Bungalow Naidu. 

India's largest textile machinery manufacturer Lakshmi Machine Works is situated in Perianaickenpalayam.

Demographics
 India census, Periyanaickenpalayam had a population of 22,921. Males constitute 52% of the population and females 48%. Periyanaickenpalayam has an average literacy rate of 79%, higher than the national average of 59.5%: male literacy is 84%, and female literacy is 73%. In Periyanaickenpalayam, 9% of the population is under 6 years of age.

References

Cities and towns in Coimbatore district
Suburbs of Coimbatore